Dan Remsberg (born April 7, 1962) is a former American football tackle. He played for the Denver Broncos from 1986 to 1987.

References

1962 births
Living people
American football tackles
Abilene Christian Wildcats football players
Denver Broncos players